The 2020 Supersport 300 World Championship was the fourth season of the Supersport 300 World Championship of motorcycle racing.

Race calendar and results
The 2020 season calendar was announced on 21 November 2019, with 10 races scheduled.

Due to the coronavirus pandemic, the Jerez, Assen, Aragon and Misano rounds were rescheduled to a later date, while the Imola and Oschersleben rounds were cancelled. As a result of updates made to the MotoGP calendar for the same reason, the French round date was also affected. Despite having already been rescheduled, the Assen round was later postponed to a to-be-determined date, along with the Donington round.

On 19 June, an updated calendar was published; for the restart, Jerez and Portimão were brought forward from their respective dates and a second round at Aragon was added to the schedule. Other four rounds—the first at Aragon, as well as Barcelona, Magny-Cours and Misano—either kept their original or revised dates, although the latter event was labelled as 'to be confirmed'. Two rounds—Donington and Assen—were included without a confirmed date and were subsequently cancelled on 24 July. The Misano round was cancelled and replaced by a round in Estoril on 18 August.

Along with the calendar, the event timetable was also revised, as an additional race to be held on Saturday was added to each weekend.

Entry list

All entries used Pirelli tyres.

Championship standings
Points system

Riders' championship

Manufacturers' championship

Notes

References

External links 
 Official website

Superbike
Superbike
Supersport 300 World Championship seasons